Samuel Jules "Nails" Morton (July 3, 1893 – May 13, 1923) was a soldier during World War I and later a high-ranking member of Dean O'Banion's Northside gang.

Biography

Early life
Born in New York City, Morton grew up in Chicago in the Jewish neighborhood centering on Maxwell Street. As a young man, Morton won the admiration of the Jewish community for making a part of Chicago's West Side safe for them by creating a defense society to drive their enemies away. The Chicago police also suspected him of at least two murders.

World War I
After the United States declared war on Imperial Germany, Morton enlisted in the American Expeditionary Forces. He served with distinction and was awarded the Croix de Guerre by the French Republic. By the war's end, he had been promoted to Lieutenant.

Death
Morton died when he was thrown from his horse and trampled as he was riding in Lincoln Park.  He was 29 years old.  Grief-stricken members of the North Side gang, including George "Bugs" Moran, Vincent "The Schemer" Drucci, Earl "Hymie" Weiss, and Louis "Two Gun" Alterie took the offending horse from its stables, led it to the spot where Morton died, and then shot the horse "with four slugs to the head".

Morton received a funeral with full military honors by the American Legion. He was seen off by prominent politicians, city officials, and gangsters.  According to the Chicago Daily News, 5,000 Jews paid their respects to Morton that day.

In popular culture
Morton's death and its aftermath were later fictionalized in the film The Public Enemy. After a horse kicks to death his friend Samuel "Nails" Nathan (Leslie Fenton), Tom Powers (James Cagney) buys the horse and guns it down in the stables. The incident may also have inspired the infamous horse head scene in Mario Puzo's The Godfather.

References

Bibliography
English, T. J. Paddy Whacked: The Untold Story of the Irish American Gangster. New York: HarperCollins, 2005.  
Kelly, Robert J. Encyclopedia of Organized Crime in the United States. Westport, Connecticut: Greenwood Press, 2000.  

Sifakis, Carl. The Mafia Encyclopedia. New York: Da Capo Press, 2005. 
Sifakis, Carl. The Encyclopedia of American Crime. New York: Facts on File Inc., 2001.

Further reading
Fried, Albert. The Rise and Fall of the Jewish Gangster in America. New York: Holt, Rinehart and Winston, 1980.  
Mayer, Milton Sanford. "What Can a Man Do?". University of Chicago Press, 1964.
O'Kane, James M. The Crooked Ladder. New Brunswick, New Jersey: Transaction Publishers, 1994.  
Reppetto, Thomas. American Mafia: A History of Its Rise to Power. New York: Henry Holt & Co., 2004. 
Asbury, Herbert.  The Gangs of Chicago: An Informal History of the Chicago Underworld. New York: Thunder's Mouth Press, 1986.

External links

Jewish American gangsters
1894 births
1923 deaths
North Side Gang
Prohibition-era gangsters
United States Army officers
Military personnel from Chicago
Recipients of the Croix de Guerre (France)
20th-century American Jews